Anagarika Shri Munindra (1915 – October 14, 2003), also called Munindraji by his disciples, was an Indian Vipassanā meditation teacher, who taught many notable meditation teachers including Dipa Ma, Joseph Goldstein, Sharon Salzberg, and Surya Das. Anagarika simply means a practicing Buddhist who leads a nomadic life without attachment in order to focus on the Dhamma.

Early life
Anagarika was born in Chittagong, British India and descended from Buddhists of India forced east by the eleventh century Muslim invasion.

Buddhist life
He was an active member of the Maha Bodhi Society whose purpose was the resuscitation of Buddhism in India and the restoration of ancient Buddhist shrines there. Munindra was the superintendent of the Mahabodhi Temple at Bodh Gaya from 1953 to 1957, the first Buddhist to hold this position in modern times.  From 1957 to 1966 he lived in Burma, where he was a close disciple of Mahasi Sayadaw, who authorized him to teach vipassana meditation.  While in Burma he also studied the Pāli Canon thoroughly, before returning to India, where he taught vipassana for many years in Bodh Gaya. He was known to be very open-minded and relaxed in the way he taught. He would encourage his students to study with other teachers, and investigate other traditions.

In the tradition of Ledi Sayadaw
During his stay in Burma he came in close contact with S. N. Goenka and had dhamma discussions with him. Subsequently, he wished to learn Vipassana from Sayagyi U Ba Khin but since he had already learnt Vipassana from a monk, Sayagyi expressed his inability to teach him Vipassana in the tradition of Ledi Sayadaw.

Finally, his wish was fulfilled a few years later when S. N. Goenka started teaching Vipassana in India. Munindra joined a 10-day course conducted by Goenka at Bodhgaya. He was very impressed by the technique, as expressed in a letter of appreciation that he wrote to Sayagyi U Ba Khin after the course.

Final years 
He spent the last part of his life living at the Vipassana Research Institute's main meditation centre, Dhamma Giri, at the village of Igatpuri, India, as a guest of his close friend S. N. Goenka.

References
 Citations

 Bibliography

External links

Thoughts about Munindra from a book edited by Sharon Salzberg
Recording of talk given at Golden Gate Park, San Francisco in 1977
S. N. Goenka reminisces his friend Munindra

1914 births
2003 deaths
Indian Buddhists
Buddhist spiritual teachers
People from Chittagong
Bengali people
Students of S. N. Goenka
Students of Mahasi Sayadaw
Anagārikas